Juliet Graham (born 17 June 1954) is a Canadian equestrian. She competed in two events at the 1976 Summer Olympics.

References

1954 births
Living people
Canadian female equestrians
Olympic equestrians of Canada
Equestrians at the 1976 Summer Olympics
People from Leamington Spa